The PLL-01, also known as the WAC-021, is a type of 155 mm howitzer designed by Gerald Bull and built by Chinese defense manufacturer Norinco.

History
In 1980s, Chinese military industry acquired the license to produce GHN-45 howitzer from Noricum, subsidiary of the Austrian company Voest-Alpine, whom developed CHN-45 based on the design of the GC-45 howitzer. GHN-45 (Gun, Howitzer, Noricum) featured several improvements to the original GC-45, such as better ammunition and fire control systems. Due to the design improvement, GHN-45 had considerably longer ranges than other 155 mm cannon systems used by NATO and Western countries. This capability initially caused worry for allied forces in the Persian Gulf War. The designer Gerald Bull was contacted by China to develop his work for them, which he agreed. China also purchased extended-range ammunition technology from him.

The Chinese production designation of the GHN-45 is WAC-021 and PLL-01, which entered service in 1987. China continue to acquire and develop other technologies for the PLL-01, such as precision guided projectiles GP1. China also mounted the PLL-01 onto an indigenous-designed tracked chassis, resulting in the PLZ-45 (also known as the Type 88) and an ammo-carrier based on the same chassis. The PLZ-45 did not enter service with the People's Liberation Army Ground Force because China still use the doctrine developed for the Soviet-standard 152 mm ammunition at the time. However, two major batches of PLZ-45s were sold to Kuwaiti in 1997 and to Saudi Arabia in 2008.

Design
The PLL-01/WAC-201 is license-produced variant of the Austrian NORICUM GHN-45 howitzer, thus two systems are compatible in the choice of ordnance. The NORINCO Type WA-021 has an auto-frettaged barrel 45 calibers long, fitted with a multi-baffle muzzle brake, which has an efficiency of 30 percent. A screw-type breech mechanism opening to the right is employed and the chamber volume is 22.95 liters. The rifling employs 48 grooves with a twist of 1 in 20 calibers, and the grooves are understood to be three times deeper than the rifling depths found on comparable Western 155 mm designs. The weapon also accepts locally made Chinese ammunitions and NATO-compatible ammunitions.

Deployment
The weapon system is used by People's Liberation Army Ground Force, Iranian army as towed artillery. The PLZ-45 self-propelled howitzer was sold to Kuwit, Saudi Arabia and Algeria.

Variants
WAC-201 Export version, towed
PLL-01 Domestic production, towed
AH-1 Export version based on PLL-01, towed
AH-2 Export version based on AH-1, 52 calibers with longer range, towed
FGT-203 Experimental 203 mm towed howitzer. Based on PLL-01, this artillery system was developed by Norinco in cooperation with Space Research International of Belgium. 
PLZ-45 Export, self-propelled version introduced in 1997
PLZ-05 Domestic production, self-propelled version introduced in 2005
SH-1 Export, truck-mounted version introduced in 2002

References

Artillery of the People's Republic of China
Artillery of Iran
Artillery of Iraq